The discography of American singer Connie Stevens includes numerous studio and compilation albums, and 20 singles. Stevens first garnered success in 1960, when her hit song "Sixteen Reasons" peaked at number 3 on the Billboard Hot 100 and number 9 on the UK Singles Chart. She was first heard as the female voice on the 1959 hit song from Edd Byrnes, "Kookie, Kookie (Lend Me Your Comb)".

Discography
All releases are on Warner Bros. Records Inc., except where noted.

Studio albums
 Concetta (1958)
 Connie Stevens as Cricket in the Warner Bros. Series Hawaiian Eye (1960)
 From Me to You (1962)
 The Hank Williams Song Book (1962)
 Tradition... a Family at Christmas (2010, GTS Records) with her daughters, Joely and Tricia Leigh Fisher

Compilations
 Highlights of Connie Stevens (1963) – Japan 12-track LP
 The Best of Connie Stevens (196-) – Japan 14-track LP
 The Best of Connie Stevens (1982/1990) – Japan and Australia 14-track LP/Japan 18-track CD
 The Complete Warner Bros. Singles (2012, Real Gone Music/Warner) US 36-track 2-CD
 The Very Best of Connie Stevens (2012) – Japan 23-track CD

Bootleg compilations
These bootlegs consist of unlicensed recordings from Warner Bros. and other labels.

 Sixteen Reasons (1991, Teenager Records) – Denmark 17-track LP
 Sixteen Reasons (1994, Teen Sound Records) – Canada 34-track CD
 The Ultimate Collection (2003, Teenager Records) – Germany 30-track CD
 America's Sweetheart (2011, Babe) – unknown 30-track CD
 Sensational (2012, Remember) – Germany 28-track CD
 Sixteen Reasons (2015, Jasmine Records) – UK 33-track CD
 Stereo Singles Collection (2022, Classics France) – "Switzerland" 28-track CD

Singles

References

External links
 
 

Pop music discographies
Discographies of American artists